Gagliole is a comune (municipality) in the Province of Macerata in the Italian region Marche, located about  southwest of Ancona and about  west of Macerata.

Among the churches in the town are:
San Giovanni
San Lorenzo a Torreto
San Michele Arcangelo
Eremo della Madonna delle Macchie
Madonna della Pieve or Madonna di San Zenone
San Giuseppe

References

Cities and towns in the Marche